Evan Davies (birth unknown – death unknown) was a Welsh rugby union, and professional rugby league footballer who played in the 1910s and 1920s.

Playing career
Evan Davies was born in Tumble, Wales.

International honours
Davies three won caps for Wales (RL) while at Oldham between 1912 and 1923. He was selected to go on the 1920 Great Britain Lions tour of Australia and New Zealand. He won caps for Great Britain while at Oldham in 1920 against New Zealand (3 matches).

Championship final appearances

Challenge Cup Final appearances
About Evan Davies's time, there was Oldham's 16-3 victory over Hull Kingston Rovers in the 1925 Challenge Cup Final during the 1924–25 season at Headingley Rugby Stadium, and the 3-9 defeat by Swinton in the 1926 Challenge Cup Final during the 1925–26 season at Athletic Grounds, Rochdale

County Cup Final appearances
About Evan Davies' time, there was Oldham's 5-7 defeat by Warrington in the 1921 Lancashire County Cup Final during the 1921–22 season at The Cliff, Broughton, Salford on Saturday 3 December 1921, and played right-, i.e. number 3, in the 10-0 victory over St Helens Recs in the 1924 Lancashire County Cup Final during the 1924–25 season at The Willows, Salford on Saturday 22 November 1924.

References

External links
!Great Britain Statistics at englandrl.co.uk (statistics currently missing due to not having appeared for both Great Britain, and England)
Statistics at orl-heritagetrust.org.uk

Footballers who switched code
Great Britain national rugby league team players
Llanelli RFC players
Oldham R.L.F.C. players
Place of death missing
Rugby league centres
Rugby league players from Carmarthenshire
Rugby union players from Tumble
Wales national rugby league team players
Welsh rugby league players
Welsh rugby union players
Year of birth missing
Year of death missing